Icrave may refer to:

 Icrave (design firm)
 iCraveTV, a Canadian website which offered streaming Internet broadcasts of conventional television stations

See also
 Crave